The 2 arrondissements of the Hautes-Alpes department are:
 Arrondissement of Briançon, (subprefecture: Briançon) with 36 communes.  The population of the arrondissement was 35,266 in 2016.  
 Arrondissement of Gap, (prefecture of the Hautes-Alpes department: Gap) with 126 communes.  The population of the arrondissement was 105,841 in 2016.

History

In 1800 the arrondissements of Gap, Briançon and Embrun were established. The arrondissement of Embrun was disbanded in 1926.

References

Hautes-Alpes